Piya Mann Bhaye is a Pakistani romantic drama series, produced by Asif Raza Mir and Babar Javed under their production company A&B Entertainment. It stars Ushna Shah, Sami Khan and Rabab Hashim in lead roles. The story of Shaheer, Hania and Mantasha is of tragedy rivalry and betrayal. It shows how poverty can build walls in-between siblings and how a real sister can destroy another's life just to attain her own dreams.

The series is the second appearance together of Shah and Khan after their appearances in Bashar Momin

Cast
Ushna Shah as Hania
Sami Khan as Shaheer Sikandar
Rabab Hashim as Mantasha
Abdullah Ejaz as Zawar
Shehzeen Rahat as Abiha- Hania and Mantasha's younger sister
Sajida Syed as Aliya- Mantasha, Hania and Abiha's mother
Nazli Nasr as Shaista- Zawar's mother and Aliya's cousin
Manzoor Qureshi as Kamal Ahmed- Mantasha, Hania and Abiha's father
Zaheen Tahira as Iffat Bee- housekeeper at Zawar's home
Afraz Rasool as Faiz- Abiha's fiance
Gul-e-Rana as Rehana- Faiz and Sara mother and Kamal's sister
Syed Mohammad Ahmed as Zawar's father
Azekah Daniel as Sara- Faiz's sister
Ghana Ali as Maham- Shaheer's friend
Erum Azam as Natasha- model for Shaheer's photography assignment and her girlfriend
Falak Naz as Salma- matchmaker
Vasia Fatima as Saman- Hania's elite friend
Birjees Farooqui as Aliya- Shaista's cousin
Hamid Naveed
Esha Noor

Broadcast and release

Broadcast
Piya Mann Bhaye premiered on 11 February 2015 . Piya Mann Bhaye aired a bi-weekly episode on every Wednesday and Thursday, starting from its premiere date, with time slot of 9:00 pm. It also aired on Geo Kahani, sister channel of Geo Entertainment.

Digital release and streaming service
Piya Mann Bhaye was also uploaded on YouTube alongside its airing on TV but later, Geo Network protected all its episodes from YouTube and the series had no episodes available in the Pakistani region. Later in 2018, episodes were uploaded on Geo Kahani official Youtube channel.

In October 2020, the drama serial was released on Amazon Prime for streaming in selected regions. It is also available for streaming on Indian OTT platform, Zee5.

References

External links

Piya Mann Bhaye- Official site

Pakistani romantic drama television series
Pakistani television series
Urdu-language television shows
Geo TV original programming
2015 Pakistani television series debuts
Pakistani romance television series